Yousef Al-Mozairib Al-Shammari (born 9 December 1997) is a Saudi Arabian professional footballer who plays as a striker for SPL side Al-Batin.

Career statistics

Club

Honours
Al-Batin
MS League: 2019–20

References

External links
 

1997 births
Living people
Saudi Arabian footballers
Arar FC players
Al Batin FC players
Saudi Professional League players
Saudi First Division League players
Association football forwards